The Hongqi HQ9 is a luxury minivan produced by the Chinese automaker Hongqi since 2022.

Overview 
The Hongqi HQ9 is a 7-seater vehicle. The interior features leather seats, wooden trim, and a two-screen setup. The center console is dominated by a large wireless charging pad and additionally, a 16-speaker Dynaudio sound system is in charge of the music. The front row of the HQ9 has a digital instrument cluster and a central infotainment screen on the dashboard.

The Hongqi HQ9 is powered by a 2.0-litre turbocharged gasoline engine plus 48V mild hybrid system with a maximum output of 252 hp and 380Nm, mated to an eight-speed semi-automatic transmission.

Bestune M9 
A rebadged version produced by Bestune was set to be launched in November 2022 during the 2022 Guangzhou Auto Show. Bestune's version of the MPV was expected to be named the Bestune M9, and features restyled front and rear end designs.

References

External links 

Cars introduced in 2022
Cars of China
Flagship vehicles
Minivans
Full-size vehicles
Front-wheel-drive vehicles
Hybrid minivans